George Bank may refer to:

George Bligh Bank, a seamount in the northeast Atlantic, west of Scotland
Georges Bank, large elevated area of the sea floor between Cape Cod, Massachusetts (USA), and Cape Sable Island, Nova Scotia

See also
 
 George Banks (disambiguation)